Jones College is a public community college in Ellisville, Mississippi. It is accredited by the Commission on Colleges of the Southern Association of Colleges and Schools and serves its eight-county district consisting of Clarke, Covington, Greene, Jasper, Jones, Perry, Smith and Wayne counties. The college holds membership in the Mississippi Association of Colleges, the Mississippi Association of Community Colleges Conference and NJCAA.

History 
In 1922, Mississippi allowed college courses to be included in the curriculum of agricultural high schools. The Jones County Agricultural High School became the Jones County Agricultural High School and Junior College. The Jones County Agricultural High School was founded in 1911. In September 1927, the first 26 students attended the college. The Junior College separated from the Jones County Agricultural High School in 1957.

In 2018, the college was rebranded as Jones College. The school is still legally called Jones County Junior College.

Athletics 
Although a community college, its sports teams have achieved some notability. In 1955, the Jones County Junior College football team became the first all-white team in Mississippi to play a racially integrated team. This occurred when Jones County played in the Junior Rose Bowl, now the Pasadena Bowl, against Compton Community College in Compton, California. 

Jones has won three NJCAA national championships and 30 regional titles, as of 2023. 

The Bobcats captured the 2013-14 NJCAA Division I Men's Basketball Championship with an 87-77 victory over Indian Hills Community College (Iowa) on March 22 at the Hutchinson Sports Arena in Hutchinson, Kansas.

The Bobcats then claimed the 2016 NJCAA Division II Baseball crown in a 7-1 win over GateWay Community College and compiled a final record of 54-9.

In 2018, the Lady Bobcats won the NJCAA Division II Softball National Championship. They swept the national tournament, winning five straight games in four days. Jones beat Potomac St. (West Virginia), 13-0 in five innings; Illinois Central College, 10-2 in six innings; LSU-Eunice, 8-7; Phoenix College, 20-1 in five innings and Phoenix again, 18-2, in the championship game.

Notable alumni

Football 

Stetson Bennett, Quarterback, University of Georgia, National Champion 2022, 2023, and was named the National Championship Offensive MVP for both games.
Deion Branch, former NFL wide receiver and Super Bowl XXXIX MVP.
Jackie Parker, football player, member of the College Football Hall of Fame and the Canadian Football Hall of Fame.
Damien Wilson, NFL linebacker for the Kansas City Chiefs and Super Bowl LIV champion.
Ellis Lankster, NFL Cornerback
Javon Kinlaw, NFL defensive tackle for the San Francisco 49ers.
Johnathan Abram, NFL Safety

Other 

Charles W. Pickering (Class of 1957), former Mississippi state senator and retired judge of the United States District Court for the Southern District of Mississippi and the United States Court of Appeal for the Fifth Circuit
Stacey Pickering, State Auditor of Mississippi
Red West, actor
Chase Sherman, professional Mixed Martial Artist, current UFC Heavyweight
Gary Staples, Mississippi state legislator
Chris McDaniel, Attorney, federal law clerk, radio host, Mississippi Senator

Notable faculty

Ray Perkins, former head football coach
Anthony Maddox, former assistant football coach

References

External links
Official web site
Official athletics website

 
Community colleges in Mississippi
Schools in Jones County, Mississippi
Universities and colleges accredited by the Southern Association of Colleges and Schools
Educational institutions established in 1911
Education in Jones County, Mississippi
Buildings and structures in Jones County, Mississippi
NJCAA athletics
1911 establishments in Mississippi